Pratiksha Jadhav (born 17 January 1990) is an Indian actress who was born and brought up in Pune. She is best known for her work in Marathi cinema, Marathi serials, Hindi serials and Marathi plays.

Early life

During her college days she actively participated in inter-collegiate drama competitions. She started her acting career from Marathi movie "Chala Khel Khelu Ya Doghe" in 2009. She also acted in TV commercials and serials.

Career
She acted in various Marathi films and commercial dramas. She is also classical dancer. She appeared in comic role in Marathi film "Bhootacha Honeymoon" which received appreciation from audience.

Filmography

Marathi films 
Are Deva (2007)
Jakhami police(2008)
Chala Khel Khelu Ya Doghe (2009)
Tatya Vinchu Lage Raho (2013)
Power (2013)
Bhootacha Honeymoon (2013)
He Milan Saubhagyache (2013)
Saubhagya Majha Daivat (2015)
Dagudumootha Dandakor (2015 South Indian)

Marathi plays 
Darling Darling (2009)
Me Sharukh Manjar Sumbhekar (2010)
Karun Gelo Gaon (2011)

Hindi serials 
Crime Patrol (2016)
Dil Dhoondta Hai (2017)

Marathi serials 
Dilya Ghari Tu Sukhi Raha (2011-2012)
Mendichya Panavar (2012)
Chhoti Malkin (2017)
Molkarin Bai - Mothi Tichi Savali (2019-2020)
Devmanus (2020-2021)
Tuza Maza Jamtay (2021)
Tuzhya Ishqacha Naadkhula (2021)
Gatha Navnathanchi (2021)

References

External links
 

Actresses from Maharashtra
Actresses in Marathi cinema
Living people
Marathi actors
Actresses in Marathi theatre
Actresses in Hindi television
Actresses in Marathi television
Indian television actresses
Indian film actresses
20th-century Indian actresses
21st-century Indian actresses
Indian stage actresses
1987 births